The Battle of Gravia Inn was fought between Greek revolutionaries and the Ottoman Empire during the Greek War of Independence. The Greek leaders Odysseas Androutsos, Yannis Gouras and Angelis Govios, with a group of  120 men, repulsed an Ottoman army numbering 8,000 to 9,000 men and artillery under the command of Omer Vrioni and Köse Mehmed. The battle ended with heavy losses for the Ottomans and minimal casualties on the Greek side.

The Ottoman army under the command of Omer Vrioni, following his defeat of the Greeks at the Battle of Alamana and the execution of their leader Athanasios Diakos, planned to attack the Peloponnese with an army of 11,000 men. However, his army was met by a Greek group numbering 120 men, under the command of Odysseas Androutsos, who had barricaded themselves inside an old inn. The Ottoman army surrounded the area and attacked the inn but was driven back with heavy losses. At night, while the Ottoman army paused their attacks to bring up some cannons in order to bombard the inn, the Greeks escaped the inn and found safety in the mountains before the cannons arrived.

This battle is considered important to the outcome of the Greek revolution because it forced Omer Vrioni to retreat to Euboea, leaving the Greeks to consolidate their gains in the Peloponnese and capture the Ottoman capital of the Peloponnese, Tripoli.

Background
In May 1821, after crushing the Greek resistance at the Battle of Alamana and putting Athanasios Diakos to death, Omer Vrioni headed south into the Peloponnese from his base at Lamia, seeking to crush the Greek rebellion with an army of 8,000 Albanian men. However, as he was advancing, a Greek revolutionary captain, Odysseas Androutsos, and 120 men fortified themselves in an old inn near the centre of the road.

The other two Greek captains who had come with Androutsos, Dimitrios Panourgias and Ioannis Dyovouniotis, took their men and assumed a higher position on the other side of the road. They did this because they assumed that Androutsos' stand would end up a disaster like Alamana and being up high would allow them to retreat, and also to flank the assailants and cover Androutsos' men's possible retreat, if needed. When Vrioni arrived he dispersed his men through the hills and surrounded the inn. He sent a Dervish to negotiate with Androutsos, but when he was shot dead at the door Vrioni ordered the attack.

Battle

As soon as Vrioni ordered the attack, a detachment of Albanian soldiers charged the building. As they entered the building they were met by a barrage of gunfire. The Albanians were forced to retreat under heavy fire and suffered many casualties from the concealed Greeks. Androutsos had trained his men to fire by a European method; one group of his soldiers would fire in unison, while another group would reload their guns to fire in turn and so forth. This method was the best way to repel any kind of massive attack, so the following Ottoman assaults also met a barrage of fire and were forced to retreat.

Vrioni, enraged by the losses he was suffering, ordered the cannons to be brought from Lamia. However, Androutsos had guessed his intentions and retreated with his men at night; they left the inn and escaped to the mountains while the Albanians were asleep.

Aftermath

The casualties suffered by Vrioni were heavy, with 300 soldiers dead and 600 wounded in a couple of hours of fighting, while the Greeks had only six countrymen dead. This battle shocked him into uncertainty and he decided to retreat to the island of Euboea, just off the coast of Attica, where he would later combine forces with Köse Mehmed. Although the final outcome of the battle is considered to be ambiguous, it is often recognized as a Greek victory of attrition. However, both Androutsos and Omer Vrioni finally retreated, so the outcome is quite equivocal. Nevertheless the Battle of Gravia was considered to be an important event in the Greek War of Independence. By forcing Vrioni to retreat, Androutsos allowed the Greeks in the Peloponnese to have more time to consolidate their gains as well as to capture the Ottoman capital of the Peloponnese, Tripoli.

Notes

References

Citations

General and cited references

External links
 Gallery at The Inn of Gravia 

Gravia
Gravia
Gravia
Gravia Inn
1821 in Greece
History of Phocis
May 1821 events